Horror Vacui  is a 1984 German avant-garde film directed by Rosa von Praunheim.

The film was shown at international film festivals and in 1985 at the Museum of Modern Art in New York City.

Plot
Shot in a neo-expressionist style, the film is a satire on cults of any kind. The plot follows Frankie and Hannes, a young gay couple living in Berlin. One is studying art and the other medicine. Their happy life is disrupted when Frankie attends a lecture and quickly becomes involved in a sinister cult operating as a self-help group called "Optimal Optimism". 'Madame C', a former Nazi party member, is the leader of 'Optimal Optimism'. When the cult members find out that Frankie is gay, they rape him. Hannes has to find a way to save him.

Awards
 1985: Los Angeles Film Critics Association Award

Reception
"If you have a soft spot for fantastic and ironic films, you won't feel any inner emptiness [horror vacui] with Praunheim's wealth of fantasy." (Cinema Film Journal)

Notes

References 
Murray, Raymond. Images in the Dark: An Encyclopedia of Gay and Lesbian Film and Video. TLA Publications, 1994,

External links

1984 films
1984 LGBT-related films
German LGBT-related films
West German films
Films directed by Rosa von Praunheim
1980s German films